In mathematics, an eigenvalue perturbation problem is that of finding the eigenvectors and eigenvalues of a system  that is perturbed from one with known eigenvectors and eigenvalues . This is useful for studying how sensitive the original system's eigenvectors and eigenvalues   are to changes in the system. 
This type of analysis was popularized by Lord Rayleigh, in his investigation of harmonic vibrations of a string perturbed by small inhomogeneities.

The derivations in this article are essentially self-contained and can be found in many texts on numerical linear algebra or numerical functional analysis.
This article is focused on the case of the perturbation of a simple eigenvalue (see  in 
multiplicity of eigenvalues)

Why generalized eigenvalues? 
In the entry , applications of eigenvalues and eigenvectors we find numerous scientific fields in which eigenvalues are used to obtain solutions.  Generalized_eigenvalue_problem are less widespread but are a key in the study of vibrations.
They are useful when we use the  Galerkin method  or  Rayleigh-Ritz method to find approximate 
solutions of partial differential equations modeling vibrations of structures such as strings and plates;  the paper of Courant (1943) 
 is fundamental.  The Finite element method is  a widespread particular case.

In classical mechanics, we may find generalized eigenvalues when we look for vibrations of  multiple degrees of freedom systems close to equilibrium; the kinetic energy provides the mass matrix , the potential strain energy provides the rigidity matrix .
To get details, for example see the first section of this article of Weinstein (1941, in French)

With both methods, we obtain a system of differential equations or Matrix differential equation
 with the mass matrix  , the damping matrix  and the rigidity matrix . If we neglect the damping effect, we use , we can look for a solution  of the following form ; we obtain that  and are solution of the generalized eigenvalue problem

Setting of perturbation for a generalized eigenvalue problem
Suppose we have solutions to the generalized eigenvalue problem,

It is also required that the eigenvalues are distinct.

Now suppose we want to change the matrices by a small amount. That is, we want to find the eigenvalues and eigenvectors of

where

Then we expect the new eigenvalues and eigenvectors to be similar to the original, plus small perturbations:

Steps
We assume that the matrices are symmetric and positive definite, and assume we have scaled the eigenvectors such that

 

where  is the Kronecker delta. 
Now we want to solve the equation

In this article we restrict the study to first order perturbation.

First order expansion of the equation 
Substituting in (1), we get

which expands to

Canceling from (0) leaves

Removing the higher-order terms, this simplifies to

In other words,   no longer denotes the exact variation of the eigenvalue but its first order approximation.

As the matrix is symmetric, the unperturbed eigenvectors are  orthogonal and so we use them as a basis for the perturbed eigenvectors. 
That is, we want to construct

In the same way, substituting in (2), and removing higher order terms, we get 

The derivation can go on with two forks.

First fork: get first eigenvalue perturbation

Eigenvalue perturbation 
We start with (3)

or

We notice that it is the first order perturbation of the generalized Rayleigh quotient  with fixed : 

Eigenvector perturbation 

or

As the eigenvalues are assumed to be simple, for 

Moreover (5) (the first order variation of (2) ) yields

Second fork: Straightforward manipulations 
 Substituting (4) into (3) and rearranging gives

Because the eigenvectors are -orthogonal when  is positive definite, we can remove the summations by left-multiplying by :

By use of equation (1) again:

The two terms containing  are equal because left-multiplying (1) by  gives

Canceling those terms in (6) leaves

Rearranging gives

But by (2), this denominator is equal to 1. Thus

Or by changing the name of the indices:

To find , use the fact that:

implies:

Summary of the first order perturbation result 
In the case where all the matrices are Hermitian positive definite and all the eigenvalues are distinct, 

So far, we have not proved that these higher order terms may be neglected. This point may be derived using the implicit function theorem; in next section, we summarize the use of this theorem in order to obtain a first order expansion.

Theoretical derivation

Perturbation of an implicit function. 
 .
As soon as the hypothesis of the theorem is satisfied, the Jacobian matrix of  may be computed with a first order  expansion of
, we get

Eigenvalue perturbation: a theoretical basis. 
We use the previous paragraph (Perturbation of an implicit function) with somewhat different notations suited to eigenvalue perturbation; we introduce , with
 with 
. In order to use the Implicit function theorem, we study the invertibility of the Jacobian  with

. Indeed, the solution of 

 may be derived with computations similar to the derivation of the expansion.

 

When  is a simple eigenvalue, as the eigenvectors  form an orthonormal  basis, for any right-hand side, we have obtained one solution therefore,  the Jacobian is invertible.

The implicit function theorem provides a continuously differentiable function 

hence the expansion with little o notation:

.
with 

 
This is the first order expansion of the perturbed eigenvalues and eigenvectors. which is proved.

Results of sensitivity analysis with respect to the entries of the matrices

The results 
(Recall that the matrices are symmetric and so changing  will also change , hence the  term.)

Similarly

Eigenvalue sensitivity, a small example 

Existence of eigenvectors 
Note that in the above example we assumed that both the unperturbed and the perturbed systems involved symmetric matrices, which guaranteed the existence of  linearly independent eigenvectors. An eigenvalue problem involving non-symmetric matrices is not guaranteed to have  linearly independent eigenvectors, though a sufficient condition is that  and  be simultaneously diagonalizable.

The case of repeated eigenvalues 
A technical report of Rellich   for perturbation of eigenvalue problems provides several examples. The elementary examples are in chapter 2. The report may be downloaded from 
archive.org. We draw an example in which the eigenvectors have a nasty behavior.

Example 1 
Consider the following matrix  
and 

For , the matrix  has eigenvectors  belonging to eigenvalues .
Since  for  if  are any normalized eigenvectors belonging to  respectively
then  where
 are real for  
It is obviously impossible to define  , say, in such a way that  tends to a limit as  because  has no limit as 

Note in this example that 
is not only continuous but also has continuous derivatives of all orders.
Rellich draws the following important consequence.
<< Since in general the individual eigenvectors do not depend continuously on the perturbation parameter  even though the operator  does, it is necessary to work, not  with an eigenvector, but rather with the space spanned by all the eigenvectors belonging to the same eigenvalue. >>

Example 2 
This example is less nasty that the previous one. Suppose  is the 2x2 identity matrix, any vector is an eigenvector; then  is one possible eigenvector. But if one makes a small perturbation, such as

See also

 Perturbation theory (quantum mechanics)
 Bauer–Fike theorem

References
.

Further reading

Books
 
 .
 Bhatia, R. (1987). Perturbation bounds for matrix eigenvalues. SIAM.

Report

Journal papers
 Simon, B. (1982). Large orders and summability of eigenvalue perturbation theory: a mathematical overview. International Journal of Quantum Chemistry, 21(1), 3-25.
 Crandall, M. G., & Rabinowitz, P. H. (1973). Bifurcation, perturbation of simple eigenvalues, and linearized stability. Archive for Rational Mechanics and Analysis, 52(2), 161-180.
 Stewart, G. W. (1973). Error and perturbation bounds for subspaces associated with certain eigenvalue problems. SIAM review, 15(4), 727-764.
 Löwdin, P. O. (1962). Studies in perturbation theory. IV. Solution of eigenvalue problem by projection operator formalism. Journal of Mathematical Physics, 3(5), 969-982.

Perturbation theory
Differential calculus
Multivariable calculus
Linear algebra
Numerical linear algebra